was a Japanese samurai from Tosa domain. Gotō Shōjirō is his nephew-in-law.

In 1853, Toyo was appointed by the head of Tosa domain Yamanouchi Toyoshige to reform and modernize the domain.

He was assassinated on 6 May 1862 by three members of a conservative party called Tosa Kinnoto.

1816 births
1862 deaths
People from Tosa Domain
Assassinated Japanese people
19th-century Japanese people